Michigan (styled Sufjan Stevens Presents... Greetings from Michigan, the Great Lake State on the cover) is a concept album by American indie folk songwriter Sufjan Stevens, released on July 1, 2003 on Sounds Familyre, Asthmatic Kitty and Secretly Canadian in the US, and on Rough Trade in Europe. It is Stevens' third studio album and features songs referencing places, events, and persons related to the U.S. state of Michigan.

The album is the first in Stevens' fifty states project, a planned series of fifty albums to encompass all fifty U.S. states. Stevens only released two state albums before admitting the project was a "promotional gimmick". The other album was Illinois (based on the U.S. state of Illinois), which was released in 2005.

Recording and production
The album was recorded and produced entirely by Stevens, using relatively cheap equipment for a market release. All of the tracks were recorded using 2 Shure SM57s and an AKG C1000, running through a Roland VS880EX, at a sampling rate of 32 kHz (lower than the rates typically used in recording). Michigan was produced in Pro Tools, which Stevens has also used for his following albums.

The instrumentation was recorded in various locations: a home in Petoskey, Michigan; Buxton School in Williamstown, Massachusetts; the N. J. Rec. Room in Clarksboro, New Jersey; and throughout Brooklyn, including Stevens' apartment and those of his friends and St. Paul's Church.

Artwork
Album art features original hand-paintings by Martha Stewart Living crafts editor Laura Normandin.

The two-disc vinyl edition of Michigan contains an inscription within the run-off groove of each LP side:
 "Say YES to Michigan!": This was an old state tourism board slogan.
 "Go! Tigers!": The Detroit Tigers are a Major League Baseball team based in Michigan.
 "If you seek a Pleasant Peninsula, look about you": This is the English translation of Michigan's state motto.
 "The Great Lake State": This is a popular nickname for Michigan.

Critical reception

Michigan received acclaim from critics. Brandon Stosuy of Pitchfork described the album as "a beautiful, sprawling homage" to the state, noting its "lush production", but criticizing the excessive length of some of the album's tracks. In December 2003, American webzine Somewhere Cold voted Michigan Album of the Year on their 2003 Somewhere Cold Awards Hall of Fame list. A year later, in December 2004, Somewhere Cold voted Michigan Vinyl of the Year on their 2004 Somewhere Cold Awards Hall of Fame list.

Legacy
Upon the album's tenth anniversary, Stereogums Chris DeVille stated: "[Stevens's] widescreen love letter to his home state was such a momentous leap forward... Sufjan has produced a wealth of fascinating, deeply affecting (and sometimes deeply affected) music over the years... Nowadays, aggressive guitar bands like Coliseum are considered punk or metal because indie rock is the kind of genre where neoclassical whiz kid Nico Muhly contributes string arrangements to seemingly every major record, where Régine Chassagne passionately rocks the accordion, where Bon Iver channels Richard Marx unironically. Michigan’s flurry of glockenspiels, oboes, trombones, and, yes, banjos had a lot to do with that."

By 2005, it had sold 27,000 copies in the United States, according to Nielsen SoundScan.

The song "Redford" was the inspiration for the name of the protagonist of The Roots' 2011 album Undun, who used the song as the opening to a four-part instrumental movement at the end of the album.

Track listing

Bonus tracks included on the double-disc vinyl release
"Marching Band" – 3:41
"Pickerel Lake" – 3:11
"Niagara Falls" – 2:22
"Presidents and Magistrates" – 4:16
"Wolverine" – 2:10
The vinyl release also includes alternate arrangements of "Vito's Ordination Song" and "Romulus".

The European re-release of the album in 2004 also contains the bonus tracks "Marching Band" and "Pickerel Lake".

Personnel
Sufjan Stevens – oboe, English horn, piano, electronic organ, electric piano, banjo, acoustic & electric guitar, bass, vibraphone, xylophone, glockenspiel, recorders, wood flute, whistles, drums, percussion, vocals, layout, art design, arrangement, mixing, production
Monique Aiuto – vocals on "Detroit, Lift Up Your Weary Head! (Rebuild! Restore! Reconsider!)" and "Vito's Ordination Song"
Vito Aiuto – vocals on "Vito's Ordination Song"
Alan Douches – mastering at West Westside Studios in New Jersey
Tom Eaton – trumpet on "Flint (For the Unemployed and Underpaid)", "For the Widows in Paradise, For the Fatherless in Ypsilanti", "Detroit, Lift Up Your Weary Head! (Rebuild! Restore! Reconsider!)", and "Vito's Ordination Song"
Laura Normandin – artwork
John Ringhofer – trombone and vocals on "Oh God, Where Are You Now? (In Pickerel Lake? Pigeon? Marquette? Mackinaw?)"
Daniel Smith – vocals on "Vito's Ordination Song"
Elin Smith – vocals on "All Good Naysayers, Speak Up! Or Forever Hold Your Peace!", "For the Widows in Paradise, For the Fatherless in Ypsilanti", "Say Yes! to M!ch!gan!", "The Upper Peninsula", "Sleeping Bear, Sault Saint Marie", "They Also Mourn Who Do Not Wear Black (For the Homeless in Muskegon)", "Oh God, Where Are You Now? (In Pickerel Lake? Pigeon? Marquette? Mackinaw?)", and "Vito's Ordination Song"
Megan Smith – vocals on "All Good Naysayers, Speak Up! Or Forever Hold Your Peace!", "The Upper Peninsula", "Detroit, Lift Up Your Weary Head! (Rebuild! Restore! Reconsider!)", "Sleeping Bear, Sault Saint Marie", "They Also Mourn Who Do Not Wear Black (For the Homeless in Muskegon)", and "Oh God, Where Are You Now? (In Pickerel Lake? Pigeon? Marquette? Mackinaw?)"

References

External links
Asthmatic Kitty's page for Michigan

2003 albums
Albums arranged by Sufjan Stevens
Albums produced by Sufjan Stevens
Asthmatic Kitty albums
Concept albums
Music of Michigan
Michigan in fiction
Rough Trade Records albums
Secretly Canadian albums
Sounds Familyre Records albums
Sufjan Stevens albums